The 2016 Men's Asian Champions Trophy was the fourth edition of the Men's Asian Champions Trophy. The tournament was held in Kuantan, Pahang, Malaysia from 20 to 30 October 2016.

India defeated the defending champions Pakistan 3–2 in the final to win the trophy for the second time.

Teams

Umpires
Eight umpires were selected to officiate at the tournament:

Neutral Umpires
Murray Grime (AUS)
Peter Wright (RSA)

National Umpires
Rawi Anbananthan (MAS)
Ilanggo Kanabathu (MAS)
Raghu Prasad (IND)
Haider Rasool (PAK)
Shin Dong-yoon (KOR)
You Suolong (CHN)

Results
All times are Malaysia Standard Time (UTC+08:00)

Round robin

Fifth to sixth place classification

First to fourth place classification

Semi-finals

Third place game

Final

Final standings

See also
2016 Women's Asian Champions Trophy

References

International field hockey competitions hosted by Malaysia
Asian Champions Trophy
Asian Champions Trophy
Men's Asian Champions Trophy
Asian Champions Trophy
Kuantan
Sport in Pahang